Area is a quantity of a two-dimensional surface.  It may also refer to a region.

Areas or Areas may also refer to:

Art, entertainment, and media
Area (band), an Italian 70s progressive rock and jazz fusion band
Area (EP), a 2005 EP by the Futureheads
Area (journal), a journal published by the Royal Geographical Society
Area (Sirius XM), a music channel
Area, a common synonym for one of the parts of the shared virtual environment, called a zone (video games)
"Area", B-side of the 1991 Orchestral Manoeuvres in the Dark single "Then You Turn Away"

Fauna
Area (moth), a genus of moths in the family Pyralidae
Areas (moth), a genus of moths in the family Arctiidae

Geography
 Area of Outstanding Natural Beauty
 Census Metropolitan Area
 Combined statistical area
 Insular area
 Lieutenancy area
 Local government area
 Metropolitan area
 National recreation area
 Planning Areas of Singapore
 United States metropolitan area
 United States urban area
 Urban area
 Urban areas of New Zealand

Organisations
Area (LDS Church), a geographical division within The Church of Jesus Christ of Latter-day Saints
Area (nightclub), a nightclub that existed in New York City from 1983 to 1987
AREA, American Railway Engineering Association

Other uses
Area (architecture), an excavated space around the walls of a building
Area (graph drawing), in graph drawing, a way of measuring its quality
'Area, a village on the island of Rapa Iti, French Polynesia
, an HTML element, see HTML element#area
Hectare, a measure of area equal to 100 ares

See also
 Areal (disambiguation)